Alexander Stephen (21 July 1861 – 18 August 1942) was a Scotland international rugby union player.

Rugby Union career

Amateur career

Stephen played rugby union for West of Scotland.

Provincial career

He played for Glasgow District in their inter-city match against Edinburgh District in 1884.

He played for West of Scotland District in their match against East of Scotland District in February 1885. He played for West district again in 1887.

International career

Stephen was capped 2 times by Scotland from 1885 to 1886.

References

1861 births
1942 deaths
Scottish rugby union players
Scotland international rugby union players
West of Scotland FC players
Glasgow District (rugby union) players
West of Scotland District (rugby union) players
Rugby union players from Glasgow
Rugby union three-quarters